The Iraqi football league system, also known as the football pyramid, is a series of interconnected leagues for men's association football clubs in Iraq. The system has a hierarchical format with promotion and relegation between leagues at different levels, allowing even the smallest club the theoretical possibility of ultimately rising to the very top of the system. There are 5 individual levels, containing 26 leagues. It is run by the Iraq Football Association (IFA).

History

Up until 1973, leagues in Iraq were played at a regional level. The Central FA League, the Basra League and the Kirkuk League were all founded in 1948, while the Mosul League was founded in 1950. The first nationwide league to be held in the country was in the 1973–74 season when the National First Division was formed, with Al-Quwa Al-Jawiya being crowned champions. The IFA then decided to replace the competition with a new National Clubs First Division which would only be open to clubs and not institute-representative teams.

About the system
The system consists of a pyramid of leagues, bound together by the principle of promotion and relegation. A certain number of the most successful clubs in each league can rise to a higher league, whilst those that finish the season at the bottom of their league can find themselves sinking down a level. In addition to sporting performance, promotion is usually contingent on meeting criteria set by the higher league, especially concerning appropriate facilities and finances.

In theory, it is possible for a lowly local amateur club to achieve annual promotions and within a few years rise to the pinnacle of the Iraqi game and become champions of the Premier League. While this may be unlikely in practice (at the very least, in the short run), there certainly is significant movement within the pyramid.

Structure
At the top is the single division of the Premier League (level 1, which is often referred to as the "top-flight"), which has contained 20 clubs since the 2014–15 season, Division One (level 2) which consists of 24 clubs, Division Two (level 3), Division Three (level 4) and Division Four (Regional Leagues, level 5).

Promotion and relegation rules for All the levels
Premier League (level 1, 20 teams):  The bottom two teams are relegated. The third-from-bottom team enters a relegation/promotion play-off.
Division One (level 2, 24 teams): The top team in each group is automatically promoted, the bottom 4 in each group are relegated. The winner of the third-place play-off enters a promotion/relegation play-off.
Division Two (level 3, 126 teams): The top 2 teams in each group automatically promoted.
Division Three (level 4, TBD teams)
Division Four (level 5, TBD teams): Baghdad Province League, Babylon Province League, Nineveh Province League, Diyala Province League, Erbil Province League, Dhi Qar Province League, Basra Province League, Al-Anbar Province League, Saladin Province League, Kirkuk Province League, Najaf Province League Al-Qadisiyah Prvovince League, Muthanna Province League, Maysan Province League, Karbala Province League, Wasit Governorate League, Suleymaniyah Province League, Duhok Province League.

Cup eligibility
Being members of a league at a particular level also affects eligibility for Cup, or single-elimination, competitions.
FA Cup: Levels 1 to 4

The system
Level one in the pyramid, the top division of Iraq football, is the Premier League, the winners of which are regarded as the champions of Iraq and the contenders have access to the Asian premier football competition, AFC Champions League. Level 1 to 4 are operated by the Iraq Football Association while level 5 is organised by Regional associations.

See also 

 League system

Notes

References

 
Iraq